Mercy Health – St. Charles Hospital is a hospital in Oregon, Ohio and is part of Mercy Health.

References

External links
 
 

Hospitals established in 1953